Kartij Kola (also Romanized as Kārtīj Kolā and Kartīj Kolā) is a village in Talarpey Rural District, in the Central District of Simorgh County, Mazandaran Province, Iran. At the 2006 census, its population was 504, in 142 families.

References 

Populated places in Simorgh County